The Burn may refer to:

The Burn (Waterproof, Louisiana), listed on the National Register of Historic Places in Tensas Parish, Louisiana
The Burn (Natchez, Mississippi), listed on the NRHP in Adams County, Mississippi
"The Burn", a song by Framing Hanley from A Promise to Burn
"The Burn", a song by Matchbox Twenty from Mad Season
The Burn with Jeff Ross, a 2012 television series on Comedy Central